Haukland is a Norwegian surname. Notable people with the surname include:

 Hagrup Haukland, Norwegian soldier
 Ida Haukland, Norwegian heavy metal singer and bassist in Triosphere
 Bente Haukland Næss (born 1954), Norwegian businesswoman and politician

Norwegian-language surnames